Syringa reticulata subsp. pekinensis (formerly known as Syringa pekinensis), also known as the Pekin lilac or the Chinese tree lilac, grows in an open, multi-stemmed form to a height of , with a spread of . They are native to northern China but grow in USDA hardiness zones 3 through 7. It is grown as an ornamental tree in Europe and North America.

Description
The panicles change over to loose clusters of brown capsules. The bark is a red-brown color. They grow well in moist, well-drained soil. They prefer full sun but will tolerate light shade.

References

Garden plants
reticulata subsp. pekinensis
Shrubs
Flora of North-Central China